Benny Andersson has been active as a recording artist since 1964, when he joined Swedish rock-band The Hep Stars. With them, and more recently as a member of ABBA and Benny Anderssons Orkester, he became one of the most successful Swedish composers and artists. He also wrote the musicals Chess, Kristina från Duvemåla and Mamma Mia!.

This album-discography provides a comprehensive chronological summary of the work of Benny Andersson. For this reason, every studio-album and live-album which features Andersson as an artist is listed, excluding compilation albums. Besides that, it also includes the main releases from the musicals mentioned above as well as albums, which rely heavily on Andersson as composer and producer.

1960s

1970s

1980s

1990s

2000s

2010s

( * denotes that the album is still charting)

2020s

Also appears on
Beginner's Guide to Scandinavia (3CD, Nascente 2011)

See also
ABBA discography
Benny Anderssons Orkester
Hep Stars
Gemini

References

Pop music discographies
Discographies of Swedish artists
Discography